The Republican Jewish Coalition (RJC), formerly the National Jewish Coalition, founded in 1985, is a political group in the United States that supports Jewish Republicans.  The organization has more than 47 chapters throughout the United States.

Purpose
The official mission statement of the RJC is to foster and enhance ties between the American Jewish community and Republican decision makers in the United States. According to its website, the RJC "works to sensitize Republican leadership in government and the party to the concerns and issues of the Jewish community, while articulating and advocating Republican ideas and policies within the Jewish community."

The RJC also strives to build a "strong, effective and respected" voice of Jewish Republicans that can influence activities, policies and ideas in Washington and across the country.

The group's policy platform objectives include terrorism, national security, Israel–United States relations, Mideast peace process, The Palestinian Authority, Syria, Iran, immigration, energy policy, education, school prayer, affirmative action, the Workplace Religious Freedom Act, adoption, crime, taxes, welfare reform, faith-based initiatives, health care, Medicare reform, Social Security reform, and government reform.

Political activities during the 2008 presidential election
During the 2008 election campaign, the RJC ran a series of advertisements in Jewish newspapers around the United States, mostly critical of Barack Obama and linking him to individuals such as Iranian leader Mahmoud Ahmadinejad, Reverend Jeremiah Wright, and Patrick Buchanan. Salon.com also claimed the RJC was participating in polling phone calls ("push polls") made to potential voters in Pennsylvania and Florida that reportedly asked negative questions about Obama.<ref>Koppelman, Alex, "Republican Jewish group conducted anti-Obama poll", Salon.com, September 17, 2008.</ref>

Barack Obama presidency
The RJC was highly critical of the Obama administration's policies. The group questioned Obama's relationship with Zbigniew Brzezinski, Samantha Power, and Chas Freeman, whom it believes to "possess strong anti-Israel biases that are well documented". The RJC has also attacked Hillary Clinton for having made remarks regarding the United States putting more pressure on Israel.  These arguments received attention and were significantly challenged by the National Jewish Democratic Council.

In the 2012 United States presidential election, casino owner and political contributor Sheldon Adelson supported the RJC in a campaign to win over Jewish voters in battleground states.

See also
List of Jewish American politicians
National Jewish Democratic Council

References

External links
Official Website
Welch, Matt, "Republican Jewish Coalition Bars Ron Paul From Presidential Debate, Saying He's Too 'misguided and extreme'", Reason'', December 1, 2011.

Jewish Coalition
United States political action committees
Organizations established in 1985
Lobbying organizations in the United States
Jewish lobbying
Jewish-American political organizations
Zionism in the United States
1985 establishments in the United States
501(c)(4) nonprofit organizations